Frank Black Francis is a 2-CD set released in 2004 by Frank Black, roughly coinciding with the Pixies reunion tour. Disc 1 consists of a March 1987 solo acoustic demo tape recorded by engineer Gary Smith, just prior to the first Pixies recording session. Disc 2 is a contemporary recording from 2003 of Frank Black reworking a number of Pixies songs with Keith Moliné and Andy Diagram, who are part of David Thomas and Two Pale Boys.

Track listing
All tracks composed by Black Francis

Disc one {Black Francis demos}
"The Holiday Song" – 1:54
"I'm Amazed" – 1:25
"Rock a My Soul" – 1:50
"Isla de Encanta" – 1:39
"Caribou" – 3:00
"Broken Face" – 1:21
"Build High" – 1:26
"Nimrod's Son" – 2:08
"Ed Is Dead" – 2:45
"Subbacultcha" – 2:45
"Boom Chickaboom" – 2:33
"I've Been Tired" – 3:10
"Break My Body" – 1:55
"Oh My Golly!" – 1:59
"Vamos" – 2:14

Disc two {treated}
"Caribou" – 3:09
"Where Is My Mind?" – 3:41
"Cactus" – 2:41
"Nimrod's Son" – 3:01
"Levitate Me" – 2:01
"Wave of Mutilation" – 2:25
"Monkey Gone to Heaven" – 3:49
"Velouria" – 4:35
"The Holiday Song" – 2:21
"Into the White" – 3:24
"Is She Weird?" – 3:51
"Subbacultcha" – 2:56
"Planet of Sound" – 14:56

Personnel
Credits adapted from the album's liner notes.
Black Francis - vocals, acoustic guitar
Keith Moliné - guitar, violin, electronics (disc two)
Andy Diagram - trumpet, electronics (disc two)
Technical
Gary Smith - recorded by (disc one)
Andy Diagram - producer (disc two) 
Keith Moliné - producer (disc two)
Joey Santiago - additional editing
Myles Mangino - mastering
Jean Thompson - cover concept
Andrew Swainson - cover design
Black Francis - cover photography, additional photography
Ken Goes - additional photography

References

2004 albums
Black Francis albums
SpinART Records albums
Covers albums
Pixies (band)
Cooking Vinyl albums